Lev Prchala (23 March 1892, in Slezská Ostrava - 11 June 1963, in Feldbach) was a Czech military officer, legionary commander during the World War I, general of the Czechoslovak Army, minister of the Voloshyn's autonomous government of Carpathian Ruthenia in 1939, commander of the Czechoslovak Legion in Poland during the German invasion of Poland and anti-communist politician in exile during the Cold War.

Decorations

References

External links
 

1892 births
1963 deaths
Politicians from Ostrava
Czech generals
Recipients of the Croix de Guerre 1914–1918 (France)
Burials at Munich Waldfriedhof